Simon Bahne Backmann (born 27 April 1993) is a Danish footballer who plays for Rishøj BK as a striker.

References

1993 births
Living people
Danish men's footballers
Association football forwards
HB Køge players
Danish Superliga players
People from Køge Municipality
Sportspeople from Region Zealand